The 2018 Grand Prix Zagreb Open, was a wrestling event held in Zagreb, Croatia between 3–4 February 2018.

Medal table

Team ranking

Greco-Roman

Participating nations

121 competitors from 16 nations participated.
 (3)
 (4)
 (8)
 (1)
 (16)
 (6)
 (5)
 (2)
 (18)
 (1)
 (6)
 (4)
 (15)
 (3)
 (22)
 (7)

References 

Grand Prix Zagreb Open
Grand Prix Zagreb Open
International wrestling competitions hosted by Croatia
Sport in Zagreb
Wrestling in Croatia
Grand Prix Zagreb Open